The man of sin (ho anthrōpos tēs hamartias) or man of lawlessness, (anomias) is a figure referred to in the Christian Bible in the Second Epistle to the Thessalonians. He is usually equated with the Antichrist in Christian eschatology.

Biblical narrative
In , the "man of sin" is described as one who will be revealed before the Day of the Lord comes. The Codex Sinaiticus and Codex Vaticanus have the reading "man of lawlessness" and Bruce M. Metzger argues that this is the original reading even though 94% of manuscripts have "man of sin".

Identity
Nearly all commentators, both ancient and modern, identify the man of sin in 2 Thessalonians chapter 2 as the Antichrist, even though they vary greatly in who they view the Antichrist to be. The man of sin is variously identified with Caligula, Nero, the papacy and the end times Antichrist.

Views

Catholic church and Orthodox churches
The Catholic and Eastern Orthodox traditions consider the Man of Sin to come at the End of the World, when the katechon, the one who restrains, will be taken out. Katechon is also interpreted as the Grand Monarch or a new Orthodox Emperor, inaugurating a rebirth of the Holy Roman Empire.

Other views

Various Protestant and anti-Catholic commentators have linked the term and identity to the Catholic Church and the Pope. The "temple of God" is here understood to be the church; the restraining power the Roman empire.

Dispensationalist or Futurist view

Dispensationalists view this as a reference to a coming world ruler (Antichrist) who will succeed in making a peace treaty with Israel for 7 years (Daniel's 70th week) guaranteeing some sort of Middle East peace settlement with the Arab nations. This will occur after the rebuilding of the Third Temple in Jerusalem and the restoration of temple sacrifices. He will break his peace treaty with Israel 3 years into the plan, enter the "rebuilt Third Temple" and perform the abomination of desolation by setting up an idol of himself in the Temple and declare himself God.

See also
2 Thessalonians 2
 Abrogation of Old Covenant laws

Notes

References

Antichrist
Christian eschatology
Christian terminology
New Testament words and phrases
People in the Pauline epistles
Unnamed people of the Bible